Todor Krstić (1904–34), known by the nickname Toša (Тоша) and nom de guerre Algunjski (Алгуњски), was a Serbian Chetnik commander in Old Serbia and Macedonia during the Macedonian Struggle. In Bulgaria he is considered a Bulgarian renegade who switched sides, i.e. (sic) Serboman.

Life
Krstić was born in the village of Algunja in the Kosovo Vilayet of the Ottoman Empire (present-day North Macedonia).  Algunja was surrounded by Albanian-inhabited villages of Čukarka, Suševo and Mutilovo; Krstić had even before joining the organized Chetnik action, jumped into the region from Vranje, assassinating known zulumćari (persecutors of Christians). On April 18, 1902, together with Krastyo Kovachev, he joined the Bulgarian cheta of the Supreme Macedonian-Adrianople Committee with a commander Sotir Atanasov, which operated in Kriva Palanka area. With this company he moved later to the Bulgarian town of Kyustendil. He and his comrades were interned under Ottoman pressure by the Bulgarian authorities in Varna and later in Kavarna. From there, Krastev left for Russia and then settled in Belgrade, Serbia. He himself became one of the regional vojvoda (duke) and worked closely with vojvoda Petko Ilić. After the Battle of Stratsin against a Bulgarian squad in March 1912, in which Petko Ilić died, Krstić succeeded him as the unit's commander. He fought in the great battle at Šumata Trnica on March 21, 1912, in which eight Serbian rebels were killed, including Svetozar Mihajlović-Purca from Tuzla.

See also
 List of Chetnik voivodes

References

Sources

19th-century births
20th-century deaths
People from Staro Nagoričane Municipality
People from Kosovo vilayet
Serbian rebels
Serbian military personnel of the Balkan Wars
Serbian military personnel killed in action